Vice Admiral Manohar Prahlad Awati, PVSM, VrC (7 September 1927 – 4 November 2018) was a Flag Officer in the Indian Navy. He last served as the Flag Officer Commanding-in-Chief (FOC-in-C) Western Naval Command. During the Indo-Pakistani War of 1971, he was awarded the Vir Chakra for his command of the  anti-submarine corvette . The admiral was also known as the "Father of the Indian Navy's Circumnavigation Adventures".

Early life 
Awati was born to a family of academics in Surat. His father Prahlad Raoji Awati was a distinguished zoologist who later became a professor of zoology at the Royal Institute of Science, Mumbai. He joined the Indian Mercantile Marine Training Ship (IMMTS) Dufferin and graduated second in the order of merit of his course. He was offered a commission in the Royal Indian Navy (RIN) in 1945.

Naval career

Early career
He graduated from the Britannia Royal Naval College in early 1946 with prizes in seamanship and navigation. After his training, Awati returned to India, choosing to specialise as a Signals and Communications officer. As a young lieutenant, he received the colours of the Indian Navy on 27 May 1950 from the then President of India, Rajendra Prasad, at a ceremony where the RIN was renamed the Indian Navy. He subsequently served onboard the R-class destroyer .

Mysore was commissioned on 29 August 1957 by the High Commissioner of India to the United Kingdom Vijaya Lakshmi Pandit and the commissioning commanding officer was Captain S. M. Nanda. Awati was appointed the ship's signal and communications officer (SCO). He was promoted to lieutenant commander on 16 May 1958.

In May 1959, he was selected to attend the Defence Services Staff College, Wellington. Promoted to commander on 31 December 1962, he went on to command the cadet training ship INS Tir, the destroyer INS Ranjit, and the ASW frigate INS Kamorta. Awati was promoted to the substantive rank of captain on 30 June 1969.

Indo-Pakistani War of 1971

The Indo-Pakistani War of 1971 was sparked by the Bangladesh Liberation war, a conflict between the traditionally dominant West Pakistanis and the majority East Pakistanis. In 1970, East Pakistanis demanded autonomy for the state, but the Pakistani government failed to satisfy these demands and, in early 1971, a demand for secession took root in East Pakistan. In March, the Pakistan Armed Forces launched a fierce campaign to curb the secessionists, the latter including soldiers and police from East Pakistan. Thousands of East Pakistanis died, and nearly ten million refugees fled to West Bengal, an adjacent Indian state. In April, India decided to assist in the formation of the new nation of Bangladesh.

He was decorated with the Vir Chakra for his command of the Kamorta. The citation for the Vir Chakra reads as follows:

Post-War career
After the war, he was appointed the Naval Officer-in-Charge, Goa, in 1972, where he was the founding President of the Goa Yachting Association. The mutiny had occurred due to poor man-management, and Awati soon smoothed things over. In 1975, he attended the Royal College of Defence Studies in the United Kingdom.

Flag Rank
After his return to India, he was promoted to the rank of Rear Admiral. Subsequently, he was appointed Commandant of the National Defence Academy. His next posting was as the Flag Officer Commanding Western Fleet (FOCWF). During that tenure, he set up the Maritime History Society of India, in 1978. Upon promotion to the rank of Vice Admiral, he served as the Navy's Chief of Personnel for about a year and a half (this being his only tenure in Delhi in his entire career), after which he was appointed the Flag Officer Commanding-in-Chief Western Naval Command.

Post-Retirement

An avid ecologist, Awati created a scrub jungle in his native village, Vinchurni. It is said that he was once offered the job of the Ranger/Conservator of the Serengeti game reserve and the Ngorongoro forests, which he declined. He is the author of three books on nature and wildlife, Homo Sapiens and Panthera Leo, The Vanishing Indian Tiger and Nature Clubs of India.

Awati conceptualised the "Sagar Parikrama" project launched in 2007, which entailed solo circumnavigations around the globe on Indian-built sailboats. This led to the construction of the sail training boats INSV Mhadei and INSV Tarini. In 2010, Commander Dilip Donde of the Indian navy completed the first recorded solo circumnavigation by an Indian. He was followed by Commander Abhilash Tomy, who became the first Indian, and the second Asian, to do a non-stop solo circumnavigation under sails around the world. The Sagar Parikrama project also led to the first ever all-woman circumnavigation expedition, called the Navika Sagar Parikrama, which was completed in 2018 by 6 female officers of the Indian Navy.
 
In 2015, Awati presented to the NDA a Webley Revolver of .38 calibre, which was handed over to him as a token of surrender by two senior Pakistan Navy officers during the 1971 War.

Vice Admiral Awati died on 3 November 2018 at his home, in Vinchurni, Satara district, Maharashtra.

References

Bibliography

1927 births
2018 deaths
Indian Navy admirals
Royal Indian Navy officers
Chiefs of Personnel (India)
Flag Officers Commanding Western Fleet
Commandants of the National Defence Academy
Graduates of Britannia Royal Naval College
Graduates of the Royal College of Defence Studies
Recipients of the Param Vishisht Seva Medal
Recipients of the Vir Chakra
Defence Services Staff College alumni